Hashtal may refer to:
 Bala Hashtal
 Pain Hashtal